Mizanur Rahman is a diplomat and the Bangladeshi ambassador to Oman. He is a former Bangladeshi High Commissioner to Canada and Ambassador of Bangladesh to Egypt.

Early life 
Rahman graduated from the University of Dhaka after graduate studies in physics.

Career 
Rahman joined the Bangladesh Foreign Service in 1985.

Rahman had served as the Director General (Multilateral Economic Affairs) at the Ministry of Foreign Affairs. He also worked as the Director General (Administration) at the Ministry of Foreign Affairs. He later worked as the Secretary of Bi-lateral and Consular section at the Ministry of Foreign Affairs.

In 2008, Rahman was the Ambassador of Bangladesh to the Netherlands.

On 7 January 2010, Rahman was appointed the Ambassador of Bangladesh to Egypt.

Rahman was promoted to full secretary in September 2015. On 2 November 2015, Rahman was appointed High Commissioner of Bangladesh to Canada. He was also accredited as the High Commissioner of Bangladesh to Jamaica. In 2019, he attended the inauguration of the Bangladeshi Consulate General in Toronto.

On 25 September 2020, Rahman was appointed the Ambassador of Bangladesh to Oman. He was the chief guest at the reception accorded to leaders of NRB CIP Association, expatriate businessmen, in Oman. He organized a webinar between Oman Chamber of Commerce & Industry and the Federation of Bangladesh Chambers of Commerce & Industry in an effort to boost trade between the two countries.

Personal life 
Rahman is married to Nishat Rahman.

References 

Living people
High Commissioners of Bangladesh to Canada
Ambassadors of Bangladesh to Oman
University of Dhaka alumni
Ambassadors of Bangladesh to Egypt
Ambassadors of Bangladesh to the Netherlands
Year of birth missing (living people)